A Wildlife Management Area (WMA) is a protected area set aside for the conservation of wildlife and for recreational activities involving wildlife.

New Zealand

There are 11 Wildlife Management Areas in New Zealand:

 Horsham Downs Wildlife Management Reserves, Waikato
 Waihi Estuary Wildlife Management Reserve, Bay of Plenty
 Lake Waiau Wildlife Management Reserve, Manawatū-Whanganui
 Koitiata Wildlife Management Reserve, Manawatū-Whanganui
 Fletcher Creek Wildlife Management Area, West Coast
 Te Wharau Wildlife Management Area, West Coast
 Granville Wildlife Management Area, West Coast
 Hochstetter Wildlife Management Area, West Coast
 Wanganui River Flat Wildlife Management Area, West Coast
 Oneone Wildlife Management Area, West Coast
 Pye Creek Wildlife Management Area, West Coast

Papua New Guinea

In Papua New Guinea a Wildlife Management Area is the simplest form of protected area. A WMA designation protects an area of land or water while retaining full power to landowners to manage their land. WMAs are managed by an elected committee formed of customary landowners.

The current Wildlife Management Areas are:
 Tonda Wildlife Management Area, Western Province
 Crater Mountain Wildlife Management Area, Eastern Highlands Province
 Kamiali Wildlife Management Area, Morobe Province
 Lake Kutubu Wildlife Management Area, Southern Highlands Province
 Oi Mada Wara Wildlife Management Area, Goodenough Island, Milne Bay Province
 Sulamesi Wildlife Management Area, Mount Bosavi, Southern Highlands Province
 Maza Wildlife Management Area, Western Province
 Aramba Wildlife Management Area, Western Province
 Wereaver Wildlife Management Area, Western Province
 Libano-Arisai Wildlife Management Area, Mount Bosavi, Southern Highlands Province
 Libano-Hose Wildlife Management Area, Mount Bosavi, Southern Highlands Province
 Neiru (Aird Hills) Wildlife Management Area, Gulf Province

Tanzania

The 'Community Wildlife Management Areas Consortium (CWMAC) is an umbrella organization for all other organizations in Tanzania. As of 2016 there are 22 WMA's that have received "Authorized Association" (AA) status out of a total of 38 that have been established or gazetted. WMA's include:

 Chingoli Wildlife Management Area: Gazetted 2012 it is part of the Selous-Niassa Wildlife Corridor.
 Enduimet Wildlife Management Area: Established in 2003 the  WMA is in the Longido District in the Olmolog and Tinga wards in the Western part of the Kilimanjaro Basin. The WMA borders the Kilimanjaro National Park on the South-East, the Tanzania-Kenya political boundary on the north, and the Ngasurai Open Area on the west.
 Iluma Wildlife Management Area: The WMA is located in Kilombero and Ulanga districts of the Morogoro Region in Eastern Tanzania. It is part of Selous ecosystem as well as the Kilombero Valley Ramsar site. The area borders Selous Game Reserve to the East. Most of the district area lies along the Kilombero River valley and part of it in the Rufiji Basin and Selous Game Reserve which extends to the Udzungwa Mountains National Park.
 Kimbanda Wildlife Management Area
 Kisungule Wildlife Management Area
 Mbomip - Pawaga-Idodi Wildlife Management Area
 Randileni Wildlife Management Area

United States
In the United States, WMAs exist in the following states:

 Alabama
 Arkansas
 California
 Connecticut
 Florida
 Georgia
 Iowa
 Kentucky
 Louisiana
 Maine
 Massachusetts
 Maryland
 Minnesota
 Mississippi
 Missouri
 Montana
 Nebraska
 New Jersey
 New Mexico
 Nevada
 New Hampshire 
 New York
 North Dakota
 Oklahoma
 Oregon
 Pennsylvania
 Rhode Island
 South Carolina
 Tennessee
 Texas
Utah
 Vermont
 Virginia
 West Virginia
 Illinois

References

Protected areas
 
Protected areas of Papua New Guinea
Protected areas of Tanzania
Protected areas of New Zealand